Updike is a surname of Dutch origin, and is a spelling variant of the Dutch Opdijk, a topographical name meaning someone who lived on a dike. The surname has been present in North America since the settlement of New Netherland in the 17th century. Updike used to be spelled as Updyke and many other ways, but is now most commonly spelled as Updike.

People with the surname Updike or Updyke include:

Daniel Berkeley Updike (1860–1941), American printer and historian of typography
Daniel Updike, Attorney General of Rhode Island (1722–1732) - see List of attorneys general of Rhode Island
David "Big Dave" Updyke (1830–1866), American Old West sheriff and crook - see List of Old West gunfighters
James Updyke, a one-time pen name of W. R. Burnett (1899–1982), American novelist and screenwriter
John Updike (1932–2009), American novelist, poet, short story writer, art critic, and literary critic
Matthew Updike, 21st century American Paralympic cyclist
Nancy Updike, American public radio producer and writer
Ralph E. Updike (1894–1953), a U.S. Representative from Indiana
Sarah Updike Goddard (c. 1701–1770), née Updike, American printer and a cofounder and publisher of the Providence Gazette and Country Journal

References

See also
Junius Marcellus Updyke Farm, Virginia, on the National Register of Historic Places
The Algerine Captive: or the Life and Adventures of Doctor Updike Underhill: Six Years a Prisoner among the Algerines, one of the first American novels, published in 1797

English-language surnames